Amasa Dana (October 19, 1792 – December 24, 1867) was an American lawyer and politician who served two non-consecutive terms as a U.S. Representative from New York from 1839 to 1841, and from 1843 to 1845.

Biography 
Born in Wilkes-Barre, Pennsylvania, Dana was the son of Aziel Dana and Rebecca (Cory) Dana.  He attended private schools and Dana Academy in Wilkes-Barre, studied law with his uncle Eleazer Dana in Owego, New York, attained admission to the bar in 1817 and practiced in Owego.

Political career 
Dana moved to Ithaca, New York in 1821 and continued the practice of law.  He served as district attorney of Tompkins County from 1823 to 1837.  He served as member of the New York State Assembly in 1828 and 1829.  He served as president and trustee of the village of Ithaca in 1835, 1836, and 1839.

In 1837, Dana was elected judge of the Court of Common Pleas of Tompkins County. He was elected as a Democrat to the Twenty-sixth Congress (March 4, 1839 – March 3, 1841).  He was not a candidate for renomination in 1840, and resumed the practice of law.  From 1842 to 1843, Dana served as Ithaca's town supervisor.

Tenure in Congress 
Dana was elected to the Twenty-eighth Congress (March 4, 1843 – March 3, 1845).  During this term, he served as chairman of the Committee on Expenditures in the Department of the Navy. He resumed practicing law, and also engaged in banking and business, including serving as president of the Tompkins County National Bank.  He died in Ithaca, New York, on December 24, 1867.  He was interred in Ithaca City Cemetery.

Family
In 1828, Dana married Mary Harper Speed, the daughter of Doctor Joseph Speed of Caroline, New York.  They had no children.

References

Sources

Books

External links

Amasa Dana at The Political Graveyard

1792 births
1867 deaths
Democratic Party members of the New York State Assembly
New York (state) state court judges
Politicians from Wilkes-Barre, Pennsylvania
County district attorneys in New York (state)
Democratic Party members of the United States House of Representatives from New York (state)
19th-century American politicians
19th-century American judges